Mohammed Mubarek or Mohammed bin Mubarek or Muhammad Mubarek is an Arabic patronymic name, means Mohammed, Son of Mubarek:
Mohammed Mubarek Al Hinai (born 1984), Omani footballer
Mohammed Mubarek Salah Al Qurbi (born 1975), Saudi citizen who suspected as terrorist